The following is a list of libraries in the Federated States of Micronesia.

 College of Micronesia-FSM library
 Congress of Micronesia Library
 FSM Supreme Court Law Library
 Pohnpei Public Library
 Pohnpei State Medical Library
 Rose Mackwelung Library

References

External links
 "FSM-ALAM: FSM Association of Libraries, Archives and Museums"
 "Libraries, Archives, & Museums of Pohnpei (LAMP) Association"
 "Kosrae Library Association"
 "Chuuk Association of Libraries"
 "Yap State Library Association"

 
Micronesia
Libraries
Libraries